Enua Airport  is an airport in Atiu in the Cook Islands. It is the second airport built on the island. An original grass airstrip near Areora was opened in 1977. The present airport, with a compacted coral runway, was opened in 1983.

Airlines and destinations

References

External links
 Atiu Tourism and Airport

Airports in the Cook Islands
Atiu
Airports established in 1978
1978 establishments in the Cook Islands